John Leamon (1804 – 1866) was an English-born merchant and politician in Newfoundland. He represented Port de Grave in the Newfoundland House of Assembly from 1859 to 1866 as a Conservative.

The son of Robert Leamon and Mary Cozens, he was born in Blandford and came to Brigus as an agent of Charles Cozens. From 1828 to 1833, Leamon operated in partnership with Cozens. He was a major supplier at Brigus and ran a large fishing station at Indian Harbour. Leamon originally built his home on his property near Makinsons in 1830 but, during the winter of 1833–34, moved the house ten kilometres to Brigus. He also served as road commissioner, as a member of the school board and as a justice of the peace. He married Suzanna Norman.

Hawthorne Cottage, his former home, has been designated a Canadian National Historic Site. From 1885 to 1946, it was the home of Robert Bartlett, Leamon's great grandson.

References 

Members of the Newfoundland and Labrador House of Assembly
1804 births
1866 deaths
English emigrants to pre-Confederation Newfoundland
Newfoundland Colony people